Zoulameyong is a town in Komo Department, Estuaire Province, in north-western Gabon. It lies northeast of Kango and east of the N1 road.

References
Maplandia World Gazetteer

Populated places in Estuaire Province
Komo Department